Parafossarulus striatulus  is a species of freshwater snail with gills and an operculum, an aquatic prosobranch gastropod mollusk in the family Bithyniidae.

Parafossarulus striatulus is the type species of the genus Parafossarulus.

Distribution 
This species occurs in:
 northern Vietnam,
 Shandong Province, Hunan province in China.

Parasites 
Parafossarulus striatulus is a host for:
 Clonorchis sinensis 
 Metorchis orientalis
 Echinochasmus japonicus

Parafossarulus striatulus serves as the first intermediate host for trematode Holostephanus sp. 2 and for Pleurogenidae gen. sp. 2.

References

External links 
 Laidlaw F. F.. "A note on the occurrence of Parafossarulus striatulus (Bens.) in the Malya Peninsula".  PDF. p. 133.
  Zhao W. H., Wang H. J., Wang H. Z. & Liu X. Q. (2009). "[Conversion methods of freshwater snail tissue dry mass and ash free dry mass]". Ying Yong Sheng Tai Xue Bao 20(6): 1452-1458. .

Bithyniidae
Gastropods described in 1842
Taxa named by William Henry Benson